Rüstem Pasha Caravanserai  is a caravanserai located in Edirne (formerly Adrianople in English), northwestern Turkey, commissioned by Ottoman statesman and grand vizier Rüstem Pasha and built by court architect Mimar Sinan in 1561. The building is used today as a hotel with 110 rooms after two years of redevelopment.

It`s two-storey rectangle construction with courtyard and hammam. In the front part, 21 shops are housed. In the courtyard used to be a well area and a mescite; He was destroyed during the siege by the Russians 1877/1878. The commercial courtyard was a marketing place for domestic silk moth for centuries, which were grown in the area of Edirne. The building was restored in 1972 and converted into a hotel.

References

Buildings and structures completed in 1561
Commercial buildings completed in the 16th century
Buildings and structures in Edirne
Buildings and structures of the Ottoman Empire
Caravanserais in Turkey
Ottoman caravanserais
1561 establishments in the Ottoman Empire
Mimar Sinan buildings
Redevelopment projects in Turkey
Hotels in Turkey